The Lincoln Aviator is a mid-size luxury SUV with three-row seating marketed and sold by the Lincoln brand of Ford Motor Company. One of four SUVs offered by Lincoln, the Aviator is currently in its second generation, slotted between the Lincoln Nautilus and Lincoln Navigator in size.

The first generation of the Aviator was produced from the 2003 to 2005 model years as a rebadged version of the Mercury Mountaineer (itself based on the Ford Explorer); following the Lincoln Versailles and Lincoln Blackwood pickup truck, the Aviator was one of the shortest-produced vehicles ever sold by Lincoln.  For the 2007 model year, Lincoln expanded its use of crossover SUVs; the five-passenger MKX offered a similar exterior footprint, while the MKT (introduced in 2009) offered the three-row seating of the Aviator.

For the 2020 model year, the Aviator made its return to the Lincoln model line (again based on the Ford Explorer).  For the first time in a Lincoln-brand vehicle, the Aviator is offered as a plug-in hybrid, along with Android Auto.

The first-generation Aviator was assembled at the now-closed St. Louis Assembly in Hazelwood, Missouri, alongside the Explorer and Mountaineer.  The second-generation Aviator is assembled at Chicago Assembly in Chicago, Illinois alongside the Explorer and the Ford Police Interceptor Utility.



First generation (UN152; 2003) 

The Aviator was launched for the 2003 model year, slotted below the Navigator. As with the Explorer and Mountaineer, a three-row seating configuration was standard; in contrast to the Explorer and Mountaineer, a six-passenger configuration was standard, with bucket seats and a center console in the second row (a second-row bench seat was available as a no-cost option).

Alongside the choice of four-wheel drive (4WD) configuration and towing packages, the Aviator was offered with relatively few options. In addition to all the standard features, options included heated/cooled front bucket seats, xenon (HID) headlights, 17-inch chrome wheels, and a DVD-based navigation system. These options were late availability in 2003 on the premium model and 2004 (Ultimate), 2005 (Elite). Shared with the Mountaineer, the Aviator was equipped with dual front/side airbags, side-curtain airbags, and stability and traction control.

Chassis 
Sharing its chassis with the third-generation Explorer, the Aviator is derived from the body-on-frame Ford U1 platform. Sharing its  wheelbase with the Explorer/Mountaineer, the Aviator is fitted with four-wheel independent suspension.

A standard towing package was fitted to all 4WD Aviators with a heavy-duty towing package optional on either rear-wheel drive (RWD) or 4WD models.

Powertrain 
In place of the SOHC two-valve version of the 4.6 L Modular V8 shared with the Explorer/Mountaineer and other Ford trucks, the Aviator was fitted with the DOHC four-valve version of the engine, shared with the Mustang Mach 1 and Marauder.

As with the Explorer/Mountaineer, rear-wheel drive was standard, with Lincoln offering all-wheel drive as an option; all versions were equipped with a five-speed 5R55S overdrive automatic 
transmission.

Body 
As with the Mountaineer, the Aviator derived its body construction from the third-generation Explorer, sharing its body structure, doors, and roofline with both model lines. The Aviator adopts a number of styling cues from the second-generation Navigator, which gave it the nickname "Baby Navigator", with visually similar front and rear fasciae, lower door panels/running boards, grilles, and headlamps, and license-plate surrounds. The Aviator was styled with a Lincoln-specific dashboard, adopting a design nearly identical to the Navigator. Styled similar to later-1960s Lincolns, the rectangular-designed dashboard of both models featured an instrument cluster with electroluminescent gauges and needles. The primary visual difference between an Aviator and a Navigator is the lettering on the radio cover panel; an Aviator is lettered "LINCOLN", with its Navigator counterpart lettered "NAVIGATOR". As with the Navigator, the Aviator was given model-specific seats and leather, with American walnut wood trim on the doors and steering wheel.

Trim 
At its 2002 launch, the Aviator followed the trim nomenclature of the LS and Navigator, with a Luxury base trim and Premium top-level trim. For 2004, the Premium trim was renamed Ultimate, matching the Navigator and Town Car. For 2005, the Luxury trim became the sole offering, with previous content remaining available as stand-alone options, including a rear-seat DVD player. An Elite option package was offered, which bundled all features of the Premium/Ultimate trims; the package offered a DVD-based navigation system.

Kitty Hawk Special Edition 
To commemorate the 100th anniversary of the Wright Brothers' 1903 flight at Kitty Hawk, North Carolina, and the 100th anniversary of Ford Motor Company, Lincoln created a "Kitty Hawk" limited edition of the Aviator; it was the official vehicle of the 2003 EAA Countdown to Kitty Hawk. Along with special Kitty Hawk badging and trim, the limited-edition vehicles were fitted with special wood trim, which is mink Zebrano, argent painted and chrome grille, and a rear spoiler, chrome exhaust tip, chrome wheels, xenon (HID) headlamps, black premium leather heated/cooled seats with Kitty Hawk logo embossed on front seatbacks, black carpet floor mats with stitched Kitty Hawk logo, available only in black exterior color.

Marketing and reception 
Lincoln played up the similarity to the Navigator full-size SUV with magazine ads that read, "Imitation is the sincerest form of flattery. Especially when it's yourself you're imitating." The Aviator seemed to have been met with relatively positive press coverage.

While the Aviator's styling borrowed cues from its big brother, the Navigator, it also looked similar to the very widespread Explorer with which it shared the platform. Also working against the Aviator was the fact that it was priced similar to the larger and relatively popular Expedition. Car and Driver said in a comparison test, in which the Aviator tied for fifth place, that only the car's high price and lack of certain features and no low range with the 4WD model held it out of contention for the top spots.

Replacement 
Coinciding with the model cycle of the Ford Explorer, the first-generation Lincoln Aviator was discontinued after the 2005 model year, with the final vehicle produced by St. Louis Assembly on August 19, 2005.  At the 2004 Detroit Auto Show, Lincoln previewed an intended second generation of the Aviator.  In a break from the Explorer/Mountaineer, the model line was shifting its design from a three-row SUV to a two-row crossover SUV, becoming a Lincoln counterpart of the Ford Edge CUV.  The second-generation Aviator was to skip the 2006 model year entirely, released as an early 2007 vehicle.

During 2007, Lincoln phased in a rebranding of its model line, adopting an "MK" model nomenclature for all vehicles (with the exception of the Navigator and the Town Car).  The Aviator nameplate was dropped, becoming the Lincoln MKX (X= crossover); based on the Ford CD3 platform, the production MKX served as a counterpart of the Ford Edge.

Second generation (U611; 2020) 

At the 2018 New York Auto Show, Lincoln unveiled a prototype version of its planned second-generation Aviator, slated to enter production in 2019. While not officially announced as a replacement for the MKT, the Aviator is marketed above the Nautilus and below the standard-wheelbase Navigator.

A more detailed production was later introduced at the Los Angeles Auto Show on November 28, 2018. Lincoln confirmed that the Aviator was to go on sale in the summer of 2019 as a 2020 model in North America and China afterward. Lincoln notes that it will be marketed as a midsized SUV.

Vehicle overview 
The 2018 Aviator prototype marked the debut of an all-new vehicle platform for Ford Motor Company; while the vehicle is RWD, the architecture is designed for multiple powertrain layouts, including all-wheel drive (AWD) and front-wheel drive (FWD). The second-generation Aviator shares its platform architecture with the sixth-generation Explorer. While again mechanically related to the Explorer, the Aviator is to be given its own body design. Adopting design cues from the Continental and Navigator, the Aviator adopted conservative exterior styling, to contrast from a "visual attack" (seen on competing vehicles).

No specific engine or transmission details were announced as part of the unveiling; the production Aviator will offer plug-in hybrid (PHEV) capability as an option, the first Lincoln vehicle to do so.

Making their way into the production vehicle, several technological features made their debut on the 2018 prototype Aviator. Tying the vehicle camera system with the continuously controlled dampers, Suspension Preview Technology looks at the road ahead for surface irregularities (i.e., potholes), preparing the suspension for impact and its effect on vehicle ride. Phone as a Key allows an Aviator to be driven without keys; the technology allows the smartphone of the owner to serve as the vehicle key fob, with the door-mounted keyless entry keypad allowing access in the event of phone battery failure (the interior is designed with wireless charging for smartphones).

A number of safety technology features are included, with Lincoln CoPilot360 packaging automatic emergency braking with pedestrian detection, a blind-spot information system with cross-traffic alert, lane-keeping system, lane centering, reverse camera, and auto high-beams. Reverse Brake Assist applies the brakes if the vehicle detects an object when the transmission is in reverse.

Lincoln designers worked with the Detroit Symphony Orchestra to compose 25 unique sound effects to be used for the door chime and other indicator alerts for the Aviator.

Sales

References

External links 

 
 2005 Lincoln Aviator press kit (Ford Media)

Aviator
Luxury sport utility vehicles
Luxury crossover sport utility vehicles
Mid-size sport utility vehicles
Cars introduced in 2002
2010s cars
2020s cars